Heteromeles arbutifolia (more commonly  by Californian botanists), commonly known as toyon, is a common perennial shrub native to extreme southwest Oregon, California, and the Baja California Peninsula. It is the sole species in the genus Heteromeles.

Toyon is a prominent component of the coastal sage scrub plant community, and is a part of drought-adapted chaparral and mixed oak woodland habitats. It is also known by the common names Christmas berry and California holly.

Description
Toyon typically grows from 2–5 m (rarely up to 10 m in shaded conditions) and has a rounded to irregular top. Its leaves are evergreen, alternate, sharply toothed, have short petioles, and are 5–10 cm in length and 2–4 cm wide. In the early summer it produces small white flowers 6–10 mm diameter in dense terminal corymbs. Flowering peaks in June.

The five petals are rounded. The fruit is a small pome, 5–10 mm across, bright red and berry-like, produced in large quantities, maturing in the fall and persisting well into the winter.

Phytochemistry
The plant has been used as a treatment for Alzheimer's by indigenous people of California and recent research has found a number of active compounds that are potentially beneficial to Alzheimer's treatment. These include icaricide compounds, which protect the blood-brain barrier and prevent infiltration of inflammatory cells into the brain.

Taxonomy 
The genera Photinia, Aronia, Pourthiaea, and Stranvaesia have historically been variously combined by different taxonomists. The genus Heteromeles as originally published by Max Joseph Roemer was monospecific, including Photinia arbutifolia Lindl. (1820), as H. arbutifolia (Lindl.) M. Roem, but the name was illegitimate (superfluous) because it included the type of the genus Photinia. This has since been corrected by conservation, and the name is therefore often written as Heteromeles M. Roem. nom. cons. (1847).

Varieties 

 Heteromeles arbutifolia var. arbutifolia (Lindl.) M.Roem. – Autonym
 Heteromeles arbutifolia var. cerina (Jeps.) A.E.Murray – Representative of the yellow fruiting specimens of the plant. Sporadic in distribution, and not accepted by most taxonomical authorities.
 Heteromeles arbutifolia var. macrocarpa (Munz) Munz (Island Christmas berry or island toyon) – A very rare insular variety limited to the Channel Islands of San Clemente and Santa Catalina and the Mexican Pacific island of Guadalupe. Characterized by shorter, broader, significantly larger leaves with revolute margins and little teeth, and floriferous inflorescences with larger fruits (8 to 10 mm). It is more susceptible to fungal infections of Spilocaea than the common toyon.

Toxicity
Toyon pomes are acidic and astringent, and contain a small amount of cyanogenic glycosides, which break down into hydrocyanic acid on digestion. This is removed by mild cooking. Most fruits from plants in the family Rosaceae, including apples, apricots, peaches, cherries, and plums, contain cyanide.

Some pomes, though mealy, astringent and acid when raw, were eaten fresh, or mashed into water to make a beverage.

A 2016 study found 5g of the dried berries (used as a treatment for Alzheimer's) to be safe. The study also found no cyanogenic compounds in the plant.

Uses

The pomes provided food for local Native American tribes, such as the Chumash, Tongva, and Tataviam. The pomes also can be made into a jelly. Native Americans also made a tea from the leaves as a stomach remedy. Most were dried and stored, then later cooked into porridge or pancakes. Later settlers added sugar to make custard and wine. The plants were also often cooked over a fire to remove the slightly bitter taste by Californian tribes.

The Tongva (who called the plant ashuwet) ate the berries fresh, boiled and left them in an earthen oven for 2 to 3 days, roasted them, or made them into a cider. Pulverized flowers were steeped into hot water to make tea which could be used to ease gynecological ailments. For stomach pains, bark and leaves are steeped in hot water to make tea.  The same tea can serve as a seasonal tonic and ease other body pains.  Also, applying mashed ashuwet to sores eases pain. Infected wounds are washed using an infusion of bark and leaves. The ʔívil̃uqaletem also called the plant ashwet. They often consumed the fruit both raw and cooked.

Cultivation
Toyon can be grown in domestic gardens in well-drained soil, and is cultivated as an ornamental plant as far north as Southern England. It can survive temperatures as low as -12 °C. In winter, the bright red pomes (which birds often eat voraciously) are showy.

Like many other genera in the Rosaceae tribe Maleae, toyon includes some cultivars that are susceptible to fireblight. It survives on little water, making it suitable for xeriscape gardening, and is less of a fire hazard than some chaparral plants.

They are visited by butterflies, and have a mild, hawthorn-like scent. The fruit are consumed by birds, including mockingbirds, American robins, cedar waxwings and hermit thrushes. Mammals including coyotes and bears also eat and disperse the pomes.

Culture
In the 1920s, collecting toyon branches for Christmas became so popular in Los Angeles that the State of California passed a law forbidding collecting on public land or on any land not owned by the person picking any plant without the landowner's written permission (CA Penal Code § 384a).

Toyon was adopted as the official native plant of the city of Los Angeles by the LA City Council on April 17, 2012.

See also
 California native plants

References

External links

 
 C. Michael Hogan (2008) Toyon: Heteromeles arbutifolia, iGoTerra.com
 Photos of Toyon in flower and fruit
 University of Michigan: Dearborn—Native American Ethnobotany (Heteromeles arbutifolia)
 Los Angeles City Clerk—Council Files: Toyon
 CalFlora database: Heteromeles arbutifolia
 The Living Wild Project: Toyon
 USDA Plants Profile for Heteromeles arbutifolia (toyon)
 Heteromeles arbutifolia—U.C. Photo gallery

Bird food plants
Drought-tolerant plants
Flora of Baja California
Flora of Baja California Sur
Flora of California
Flora of Oregon
Flora of Mexican Pacific Islands
Flora of the Sierra Nevada (United States)
Garden plants of North America
Maleae
Monotypic Rosaceae genera
Natural history of the California chaparral and woodlands
Natural history of the California Coast Ranges
Natural history of the Peninsular Ranges
Natural history of the San Francisco Bay Area
Natural history of the Santa Monica Mountains
Natural history of the Transverse Ranges
Plants used in traditional Native American medicine